The 2009 St. George Illawarra Dragons season was 11th in the joint venture Rugby League club's history. They competed in the NRL's 2009 Telstra Premiership under new coach Wayne Bennett and finished the season as minor premiers. However a series of losses late in the season saw them become the first minor premiers to bow out of the McIntyre system with two consecutive losses in the finals.

Season Summary
Coming off a 2008 Qualifying Final loss to the Manly-Warringah Sea Eagles and with a new Coach in the office being Wayne Bennett, the Dragons signed a number of new players but lost just as many. The Dragons were hoping to improve the previous years Qualifying Final loss, by making it even further this year. Five Toyota Cup players of 2008 have been promoted to the First Grade squad with more talented juniors rising through the ranks within the club.

St. George led the competition in defence in 2009 and finished the season with the minor premiership, the club's first. Their strong performance also led to new records for home match attendances at WIN Jubilee Oval.

St George exited the finals series in the second week of the finals.

Pre season

Regular season

Finals

2009 NRL Ladder

Squad

Transfers
Gains

Losses

References

St. George Illawarra Dragons seasons
St. George Illawarra Dragons season